Illinois Giants were a barnstorming Negro league baseball team in the 1920s.

The Illinois Giants are noted as having played in 1910 and 1919 to 1929.

Ted "Double Duty" Radcliffe joined the team in 1920.

References

Negro league baseball teams
Giants
Baseball teams disestablished in 1929
Baseball teams established in 1919